The Bangladesh national beach soccer team represents Bangladesh  in international beach soccer competitions and is controlled by the BFF, the governing body for football in Bangladesh.  Bangladesh won the title of the event of the beach soccer in the 1st South Asian Beach Games beating hosts Sri Lanka at Hambantota on Monday.

References

beach soccer
Asian national beach soccer teams